Maurice Charles Adolphe Bardonneau (22 May 1885 – 3 July 1958) was a French cyclist. He competed at the 1906 Summer Olympics (Intercalated Games) in the 5 km, 20 km and road race and won two silver medals in the last two events. In the same year he also won the UCI Motor-paced World Championships and the first stage of the Paris–Brussels road race.

References

1885 births
1958 deaths
People from Saint-Maurice, Val-de-Marne
Sportspeople from Val-de-Marne
French male cyclists
Olympic cyclists of France
Cyclists at the 1906 Intercalated Games
Medalists at the 1906 Intercalated Games
Cyclists from Île-de-France